Lester Henry Dye (July 15, 1916 – August 11, 2000) was an American football end in the National Football League for the Washington Redskins.  He played college football at Syracuse University.

Career

Dye served as the athletic director at Syracuse University from 1973 until 1978. In 1976, he hired Jim Boeheim as the seventh head basketball coach for the Syracuse Orange men's basketball team.

References

External links
 

1916 births
2000 deaths
American football ends
Clarkson Golden Knights football coaches
Syracuse Orange athletic directors
Syracuse Orange football coaches
Syracuse Orange football players
Washington Redskins players
People from Forestville, New York